Catherine of Alexandria (also spelled Katherine) is, according to tradition, a Christian saint and virgin, who was martyred in the early fourth century at the hands of the emperor Maxentius. According to her hagiography, she was both a princess and a noted scholar who became a Christian around the age of 14, converted hundreds of people to Christianity and was martyred around the age of eighteen. More than 1,100 years after Catherine's martyrdom, Joan of Arc identified her as one of the saints who appeared to and counselled her.

The Eastern Orthodox Church venerates her as a Great Martyr and celebrates her feast day on 24 or 25 November, depending on the regional tradition. In Catholicism, Catherine is traditionally revered as one of the Fourteen Holy Helpers and she is commemorated in the Roman Martyrology on 25 November. Her feast was removed from the General Roman Calendar in 1969, but restored in 2002 as an optional memorial.

Some modern scholars consider that the legend of Catherine was probably based on the life and murder of the virgin Saint Dorothea of Alexandria and the Greek philosopher Hypatia, with reversed role of a Christian and Neo-Platonist in the case of the latter. On the other hand, the Catholic Encyclopedia states that, "Although contemporary hagiographers look upon the authenticity of the various texts containing the legend of St. Catherine as more than doubtful, it is not therefore meant to cast even the shadow of a doubt around the existence of the saint."

Life
According to the traditional narrative, Catherine was the daughter of Constus, the governor of Alexandria during the reign of the emperor Maximian (286–305). From a young age she devoted herself to study. A vision of the Virgin Mary and the Child Jesus persuaded her to become a Christian. When the persecutions began under Maxentius, she went to the emperor and rebuked him for his cruelty. The emperor summoned 50 of the best pagan philosophers and orators to dispute with her, hoping that they would refute her pro-Christian arguments, but Catherine won the debate. Several of her adversaries, conquered by her eloquence, declared themselves Christians and were at once put to death.

Torture and martyrdom

The emperor gave orders to subject the saint to terrible tortures and then throw her in prison. During the confinement she was fed daily by a dove from heaven and Christ also visited her, encouraging her to fight bravely, and promised her the crown of everlasting glory. Angels tended her wounds with salve.

During her imprisonment more than 200 people came to see her, including Maxentius' wife, Valeria Maximilla; all converted to Christianity and were subsequently martyred. Twelve days later, when the dungeon was opened, a bright light and fragrant perfume filled it and Catherine came forth even more radiant and beautiful.

Upon the failure of Maxentius to make Catherine yield by way of torture, he tried to win the beautiful and wise princess over by proposing marriage. Catherine refused, declaring that her spouse was Jesus Christ, to whom she had consecrated her virginity.

The furious emperor condemned Catherine to death on a spiked breaking wheel, but, at her touch, it shattered. Maxentius ordered her to be beheaded. Catherine herself ordered the execution to commence. A milk-like substance rather than blood flowed from her neck.

Veneration
In the 6th century, the Eastern Emperor Justinian had established what is now Saint Catherine's Monastery in Egypt, which had been originally built encircling the purported burning bush seen by Moses. Countless people make the pilgrimage to the Monastery to receive miracle healing from Catherine.

Historicity

The Catholic Encyclopedia, while not denying her historicity, states that most of the details that embellish the narrative, as well as the long discourses that are put into the mouth of Catherine are to be rejected as later inventions. According to the Encyclopædia Britannica, no extant written mention of Catherine of Alexandria is known from before the 9th century, and "her historicity is doubtful".

Donald Attwater dismisses what he calls the "legend" of Saint Catherine, arguing for a lack of any "positive evidence that she ever existed outside the mind of some Greek writer who first composed what he intended to be simply an edifying romance." Harold Davis writes that "assiduous research has failed to identify Catherine with any historical personage".

Anna Brownell Jameson was the first to argue that the life of Catherine was confused with that of the slightly later Neo-Platonist philosopher Hypatia of Alexandria (d. 415). Hypatia was a Greek mathematician, astronomer, and philosopher, who was murdered by a Christian mob after being accused of exacerbating a conflict between two prominent figures in Alexandria, the governor, Orestes, and the bishop, Cyril. The idea that Catherine's life was either based on or became confused with the life of the pagan Hypatia has become a popular theory among modern scholars since. However, while Christine Walsh accepts the many parallels between Catherine and Hypatia, she does not believe there is any evidence for or against the idea that Catherine was created based on Hypatia.

Sometimes cited as a possible inspiration of Catherine, the writer Eusebius wrote, around the year 320, that the Emperor Maximinus had ordered a young Christian woman to come to his palace to become his mistress, and when she refused he had her punished by having her banished and her estates confiscated. Eusebius did not name the woman.

The earliest surviving account of Catherine's life comes around 600 years after the traditional date of her martyrdom, in the Menologium, a document compiled for Emperor Basil II (976), although the alleged rediscovery of her relics at Saint Catherine's Monastery at the foot of Mount Sinai was about 800, and presumably implies an existing cult at that date (though the common name of the monastery developed after the discovery).

In her book The Cult of St Katherine of Alexandria in Early Medieval Europe, Christine Walsh discusses "the historical Katherine":

Name
In the early Christian era it became associated with Greek  ("pure"), and the Latin spelling was changed from Katerina to Katharina to reflect this.

Reflecting this confusion, Rufinus states that her first name was Dorothea and that at her christening she acquired the name Aikaterina, a name that signifies her pure, clean and uncontaminated nature (from the Greek , 'ever clean').

Medieval cult

Catherine was one of the most important saints in the religious culture of the late Middle Ages and arguably considered the most important of the virgin martyrs, a group including Agnes of Rome, Margaret of Antioch, Barbara, Lucia of Syracuse, Valerie of Limoges and many others. Her power as an intercessor was renowned and firmly established in most versions of her hagiography, in which she specifically entreats Christ at the moment of her death to answer the prayers of those who remember her martyrdom and invoke her name.

The development of her medieval cult was spurred by the alleged rediscovery of her body around the year 800 (about 500 years after her death) at Mount Sinai, supposedly with hair still growing and a constant stream of healing oil issuing from her body. There are several pilgrimage narratives that chronicle the journey to Mount Sinai, most notably those of John Mandeville and Friar Felix Fabri. However, while the monastery at Mount Sinai was the best-known site of Catherine pilgrimage, it was also the most difficult to reach. The most prominent Western shrine was the monastery in Rouen that claimed to house Catherine's fingers. It was not alone in the west, however, and was accompanied by many scattered shrines and altars dedicated to Catherine throughout France and England. Some were better-known sites, such as Canterbury and Westminster, which claimed a phial of her oil, brought back from Mount Sinai by Edward the Confessor. Other shrines, such as St. Catherine's Hill, Hampshire were the focus of generally local pilgrimage, many of which are only identified by brief mentions in various texts, rather than by physical evidence.

St. Catharine's College, Cambridge was founded on St Catharine's Day (25 November) 1473 by Robert Woodlark (the then-provost of King's College, Cambridge) who sought to create a small community of scholars who would study exclusively theology and philosophy. Wodelarke may have chosen the name in homage to Catherine of Valois, mother of Henry VI of England, although it is more likely that it was named as part of the Renaissance cult of Saint Catherine, who was a patron saint of learning.

St Catherine's College, Oxford developed from the Delegacy for Unattached Students formed in 1868.

Catherine also had a large female following, whose devotion was less likely to be expressed through pilgrimage. The importance of the virgin martyrs as the focus of devotion and models for proper feminine behavior increased during the Late Middle Ages. Among these, St Catherine in particular was used as an exemplar for women, a status which at times superseded her intercessory role. Both Christine de Pizan and Geoffrey de la Tour Landry point to Catherine as a paragon for young women, emphasizing her model of virginity and "wifely chastity."  From the early 14th century the mystic marriage of Saint Catherine first appears in hagiographical literature and, soon after, in art. In the Western church the popularity of her cult began to reduce in the 18th century.

Veneration

Her principal symbol is the spiked wheel, which has become known as the Catherine wheel, and her feast day is celebrated on 25 November by most Christian churches. However the Russian, Polish, Serbian and Bulgarian Eastern Orthodox Churches celebrate it on 24 November. The exact origin of this tradition is not known. In 11th-century Kievan Rus, the feast day was celebrated on 25 November. Dimitry of Rostov in his  (Book of the Lives of the Saints), T.1 (1689) places the date of celebration on 24 November. A story that Empress Catherine the Great did not wish to share her patronal feast with the Leavetaking of the feast of the Presentation of the Theotokos and hence changed the date is not supported by historical evidence. One of the first Roman Catholic churches to be built in Russia, the Catholic Church of St. Catherine, was named after Catherine of Alexandria because she was Catherine the Great's patron. A footnote to the entry for 25 November in The Synaxarion compiled by Hieromonk Makarios of Simonos Petra states: "Until the 16th century, the memory of St Catherine was observed on 24 Nov. According to a note by Bartholomew of Koutloumousiou inserted in the Menaion, the Fathers of Sinai transferred the date to 25 Nov. in order that the feast might be kept with greater solemnity."

The 1908 Catholic Encyclopedia describes her historical importance:

In many places her feast was celebrated with the utmost solemnity, servile work being suppressed and the devotions attended by great numbers of people. In several dioceses of France it was observed as a Holy Day of Obligation up to the beginning of the 17th century, the splendour of its ceremonial eclipsing that of the feasts of some of the apostles. Many chapels were placed under her patronage, and nearly all churches had a statue of her, representing her according to medieval iconography with a wheel, her instrument of torture.

Customs
In France, unwed women who had attained the age of 25 were called "catherinettes". They would wear richly decorated bonnets on the day of her feast. This custom gave rise to the French idiom  ("don St. Catherine's bonnet"), to describe an unmarried woman between the ages of 25 and 30.

In memory of her sacrifice in some homes, Egyptian and other Middle Eastern foods are offered for her feast, such as hummus or tabbouleh salads. Favorites also are melons cut into circles with sherbet "hubs", or cookies shaped as spiked wheels with icing.

Meanwhile, owing to several circumstances in his life, Nicholas of Myra was considered the patron of young bachelors and students, and Catherine became the patroness of young maidens and female students. Looked upon as the holiest and most illustrious of the virgins of Christ after the Blessed Virgin Mary, it was deemed appropriate that she, of all others, should be worthy to watch over the virgins of the cloister and the young women of the world. The spiked wheel having become emblematic of the saint, wheelwrights and mechanics placed themselves under her patronage. Finally, as according to tradition she not only remained a virgin by governing her passions and conquered her executioners by wearying their patience, but triumphed in science by closing the mouths of sophists, her intercession was implored by theologians, apologists, pulpit orators, and philosophers. Before studying, writing, or preaching, they besought her to illumine their minds, guide their pens, and impart eloquence to their words. This devotion to Catherine which assumed such vast proportions in Europe after the Crusades, received additional éclat in France in the beginning of the 15th century, when it was rumoured that she had spoken to Joan of Arc and, together with Margaret of Antioch, had been divinely appointed Joan's adviser.

Devotion to Catherine remains strong amongst Eastern Catholics and Eastern Orthodox Christians. With the relative ease of travel in the modern age, pilgrimages to Saint Catherine's Monastery on Mount Sinai have increased.

Catherine of Alexandria is remembered in the Church of England with a commemoration on 25 November.

In 2022, Catherine was officially added to the Episcopal Church liturgical calendar with a feast day she shares with Barbara of Nicomedia, and Margaret of Antioch on 24 November.

Legacy

The pyrotechnic Catherine wheel, which rotates with sparks flying off in all directions, took its name from the saint's wheel of martyrdom.

The lunar impact crater Catharina is named after Saint Catherine.

Santa Catarina Island in Brazil and the State of Santa Catarina are also named after her.

The Gulf of Santa Catalina is located in the Pacific Ocean on the west coast of North America. Santa Catalina Island off the coast of California, was named by Sebastián Vizcaíno, who arrived there on her feast day. The Santa Catalina Mountains in Arizona are her namesake.

Kaarina, Finland, is named after her. One accepted origin of the namesake of St. Catharines, Ontario, is Saint Catherine of Alexandria, but there are other proposed explanations as "no definitive documentation exists to conclusively prove that the founders chose the unique spelling for any one particular reason".

St. Catherine University in St. Paul, Minnesota was founded in 1905 by the Sisters of St. Joseph of Carondelet and named for St. Catherine of Alexandria. University of Saint Katherine in San Marcos, California is the first Eastern Orthodox Christian university in the United States and the English-speaking world. St. Catherine's School, is an independent Episcopal diocesan school in Richmond, Virginia. St Helen and St Katharine, girls' school in Oxfordshire, England celebrates "St. Katharine's Day" each November. The name of St. Catharine's School for Girls (Kwun Tong) in Hong Kong was chosen over that of St. Anne because it sounds better when translated into Chinese.

St Catherine of Alexandria Parish and School in Oak Lawn, IL, USA is named after St. Catherine.

In art

Countless images of Saint Catherine are depicted in art, especially in the late Middle Ages, which is also the time that the account of Saint Catherine's Mystical Marriage makes its first literary appearance. She can usually be easily recognised as she is richly dressed and crowned, as befits her rank as a princess, and often holds or stands next to a segment of her wheel as an attribute.  She also often carries either a martyr's palm or the sword with which she was actually executed. She often has long unbound blonde or reddish hair (unbound as she is unmarried). The vision of Saint Catherine of Alexandria usually shows the Infant Christ, held by the Virgin, placing a ring (one of her attributes) on her finger, following some literary accounts, although in the version in the Golden Legend he appears to be adult, and the marriage takes place among a great crowd of angels and "all the celestial court", and these may also be shown.

She is very frequently shown attending on the Virgin and Child, and is usually prominent in scenes of the Master of the Virgo inter Virgines, showing a group of virgin saints surrounding the Virgin and Child.  Notable later paintings of Catherine include single figures by Raphael in the National Gallery, and by Caravaggio (in the Thyssen-Bornemisza Museum, Madrid).

In music
 Adest dies triumphalis, a sequence in 9 voices in honour of Saint Catherine, by Francisco Valls.
 The Catherine Wheel (album), David Byrne's musical score commissioned by Twyla Tharp for her dance project.

Contemporary media
 The opening scene of television series The Sopranos episode 38, "Amour Fou", features mob wife Carmela Soprano and her daughter Meadow Soprano in an art gallery, where (among other topics) they discuss Jusepe de Ribera's painting: The Mystical Marriage of Saint Catherine of Alexandria.
 A movie about Catherine, called Decline of an Empire, began production in January 2010 and was released in 2014.

See also

 Cathedral of St. Catherine, Old Goa
 List of Christian women of the patristic age
 Saint Catherine of Alexandria, patron saint archive
 St. Catherine of Boletice
 St. Catherine's Cathedral, Kherson, dedicated to Saint Catherine, the original name of City of Kherson was to 'the Glory of Catherine'
 St. Catherine's Day
 St. Catherine's taffy

Notes

References

Citations

Sources

External links

 Passio sanctae Katharinae– 11th century (between 1033 and 1048); at Latin Wikisource
 Details of Saint Catherine's life– Saint Catherine Orthodox Church; includes a gallery of icons of the saint
 St Catherine's church in Muhu island (Estonia)
 Saint Catherine of Alexandria at the Christian Iconography web site
 "The Life of St. Catherine, Virgin and Martyr" from the Caxton translation of the Golden Legend
 
 
 Colonnade Statue St Peter's Square

 
282 births
305 deaths
3rd-century Egyptian women
4th-century Christian martyrs
4th-century Christian saints
4th-century Egyptian women
Ancient Alexandrians
Converts to Christianity from pagan religions
Fourteen Holy Helpers
Hypatia
Late Ancient Christian female saints
Marian visionaries
People whose existence is disputed
Saints from Roman Egypt
Great Martyrs
Anglican saints